Nattaya Duanjanthuek (born 9 June 1991) is a Thai footballer who plays as a midfielder for BG Bundit Asia and the Thailand women's national team.

Career
Duanjanthuek has appeared for the Thailand women's national team, including at the 2015 AFF Women's Championship in Vietnam, where she appeared in a match against Laos on 5 May 2015, which finished as a 12–0 win. She was subsequently included in Thailand's squad for the 2015 FIFA Women's World Cup in Canada.

References

External links
 
 

1991 births
Living people
Nattaya Duanjanthuek
Nattaya Duanjanthuek
Women's association football midfielders
2015 FIFA Women's World Cup players